Francisco Javier 'Javi' Hernández García (born 20 January 1983 in Almansa, Province of Albacete, Castile-La Mancha) is a Spanish footballer who plays as a central defender.

External links

1983 births
Living people
People from Almansa
Sportspeople from the Province of Albacete
Spanish footballers
Footballers from Castilla–La Mancha
Association football defenders
Segunda División players
Segunda División B players
Tercera División players
Atlético Madrid C players
CD Tenerife B players
Benidorm CF footballers
Celta de Vigo B players
UB Conquense footballers
AD Alcorcón footballers
Deportivo Alavés players
Real Oviedo players
UCAM Murcia CF players
Marbella FC players